Seville or Sevilla can refer to several cities, towns and municipalities.

Spain and Portugal
Seville (Spanish: Sevilla), a city in Andalusia
Sevilla FC, a football team which plays in the city of Seville
Seville (province), a province in Andalusia
Sevilla (Spanish Congress Electoral District), the electoral district covering the province
Sevilla la Nueva, in Madrid
Sevilha, in Coimbra, Portugal

Americas

Colombia
Sevilla, Antioquía
Sevilla, Arauca
Sevilla, Atlántico
Sevilla, Boyaca
Sevilla, Caldas
Sevilla, Casanare
Sevilla, Córdoba
Sevilla, Huila
Sevilla, Magdalena
Sevilla, Santander
Sevilla, Tolima
Sevilla, Valle del Cauca

Costa Rica
Sevilla, San José

Cuba
Sevilla, Villa Clara
Sevilla, Santiago de Cuba

Ecuador
Sevilla, Chimborazo
Sevilla, Sucumbios

Jamaica
Sevilla la Nueva (Jamaica), the first Spanish settlement in Jamaica and the third capital established by Spain in the Americas.
Maima-Seville Heritage Park, a site for heritage education and heritage attraction created by The Jamaica National Heritage Trust in the former location of Sevilla la Nueva settlement

Mexico
Sevilla metro station (Mexico City), Mexico

Panama
Sevilla, Chiriquí

United States
Seville, California
Seville, Florida
Seville, Georgia
Seville, Ohio
Seville Township, Michigan

Australia
Seville, Victoria, a suburb of Melbourne
Seville Grove, Western Australia, a suburb of Perth

Equatorial Guinea
Sevilla de Niefang, former name for Niefang, Centro Sur Province

Philippines
Sevilla, Bohol

Other uses
Sevilla (surname)
The Seville Orange (bitter orange), a tart orange used in making marmalade, usually planted as decorative trees in Seville, Spain
"Sevilla", hit song by BZN
Sevilla (Albéniz), a composition by Isaac Albéniz
Cadillac Seville, an American automobile by the Cadillac division of General Motors
Universidad de Sevilla, a university in Seville, Spain
Seville Agreement, an agreement drafted within the Red Cross Movement
Seville (band), a rock group from Florida
Seville Statement on Violence, written by scientists in honor of 1986 UN International Year of Peace
Bryan Matthew Sevilla, the real name of pornographic actor James Deen
Dave Seville, stage name of Ross Bagdasarian Sr.; also a major character in the Alvin and the Chipmunks franchise
Gloria Sevilla (1932–2022), Filipina actress
Sevilla (Madrid Metro), a station on Line 2 of the Metro Madrid
Seville, Spain (photograph), a photograph by Henri Cartier-Bresson

ru:Севилья (значения)